The Nine Lives of Christmas is a 2014 American made-for-television romantic comedy film and Hallmark Channel original movie, written by Nancy Silvers, based on the book by Sheila Roberts. Directed by Mark Jean, it stars Brandon Routh and Kimberely Sustad. The film premiered on November 8, 2014, on the Hallmark Channel.

Plot
As a fireman, Zachary is always ready to help people, but since his parents' relationship was marked by conflict, he is opposed to commitments. He buys houses as an investment, fixes them up in his time off, and uses the profit he earns from selling them to invest in more properties. He likes dating and has been dating a model, but does not see how anyone could possibly know you are with someone you could commit to for life.

Marilee has a very romantic view of life, even though it has not worked out that way for her. She is responsible and very capable. She is also the owner of a cat named Queenie, even though the apartment complex where she lives has a strict, no-pet policy. Working her way through veterinary school, she has promised herself not to get involved with anyone until she has started her career. Zach comes across a homeless cat named Ambrose who has been cornered by a large dog. After he rescues the cat, the cat decides to move in with him, uninvited. Somehow the cats play a role in the two getting to know each other better.

Cast
 Brandon Routh as Zachary Stone 
 Kimberley Sustad as Marilee White
 Gregory Harrison as Chief Sam 
 Chelsea Hobbs as Blair
 Stephanie Bennett as Jaclyn
 Dallas Blake as Mark
 Sean Tyson as Ray
 Carey Feehan as Kyle
 Nicole Fraissinet as Anna
 Alison Araya as Lucy
 Giles Panton as Craig
 Jennifer Cheon Garcia as Sarah

Production
The film is based on the novel by the same name by Sheila Roberts. Brandon Routh and Kimberly Sustad were chosen to portray the film's leads, and Jim Head and Ted Bauman served as executive producers. Sustad has stated that her favorite part of the film was the last scene, as she felt that it was "that ‘Pretty Woman’ moment".

Release and reception
The movie was well received by its audience. The premiere for The Nine Lives of Christmas on November 8, 2014, on Hallmark garnered 3.4 million total viewers and reached 4.9 unduplicated viewers, based on Nielsen Company ratings for November 3 – 9, 2014. For its premier weekend The Nine Lives of Christmas coupled with the nearly as well viewed A Cookie Cutter Christmas shown the following night made the Hallmark Channel the most watched network both among households and in the demographic group of women 25-54. In addition, the network was rated the second most viewed cable network overall during that period. The movie had been the channel's most viewed film of the year up to that date. Hallmark has shown the film every year since. Seven years after its premiere, reviewer Sarabeth Pollock of Fansided noted it was still a fan favorite on many people's lists of holiday films to watch, confessing: "After all, there’s nothing better than the holidays, firemen, and cats."

Among critical reviewers the reception was more mixed. Being a Hallmark Christmas movie the story is confined within certain formulaic constraints. Oliver Buckley of Ready Steady Cut noted the plot was predictable and "schmaltzy, yes, but in a nice way." He went on to say he liked the cast, particularly the leads and the firehouse crew. "Brandon Routh is very watchable, and Susted is likeable and worked well with Routh and the cats." Overall he recommended the film, stating it was "actually quite a nice, relaxing watch". Blaire Erskine of The List rated the film among Hallmark's best holiday offerings. David Rapp, the senior Indie editor at Kirkus Reviews believed the movie's script was significantly better written then the book, and that actors Brandon Routh and Kimberely Sustad had infused their characters with considerably more interest then was present in the characters they were based upon. Rapp opined the Nancey Silvers screenplay offered a "master class" in how to write a good book adaptation. Blaire Erskine of The List rated the film among Hallmark's best holiday offerings. Parade magazine's Connie Wang listed The Nine Lives of Christmas as her "favorite Hallmark Channel holiday movie." The film was also given a positive mention by The New York Times. The film received particular attention from the cat lovers niche audience.

Sequel

In 2021 Hallmark released a sequel to the film, titled The Nine Kittens of Christmas. Routh and Sustad reprised their roles from the earlier film. The story picks up seven years later, after both leads have pursued their careers and moved in different directions. Marilee has been practicing veterinary medicine in Florida, and returns home to Oregon for a family function. Still living his bachelor's life, Zachery is now a captain. Preparing to leave town for a ski vacation, he discovers someone has left a box of kittens at his firehouse. Surprised by finding Marilee has returned to her home town, the two fall into working together to place the kittens in homes. Both have matured in the years gone by, and wonder what life would have been if they had made different choices when they were younger. The sequel premiered on November 25, 2021. Approximately fifteen kittens were brought in to perform in the movie. Filming took place at Fort Langley in the Langley Township, British Columbia. Sustad notes all the kittens were adopted by the crew. "Everyone has a … 'Nine Kittens of Christmas' cat. And it was so sweet. We fell in love with them. We were working with them every day." Working with kittens was challenging, but very memorable. "If Brandon and I totally fail at this sequel, the kittens are really cute and they make up for, seriously, whatever we might lack. It was mayhem. There are nine of them all the time running amok everywhere." The sequel premiered on November 25, 2021.

Tierney Bricker of E!Online ranked the sequel in the middle of the pack among Hallmark's thirty-one new Christmas movies for 2021. The reviewer felt the story line was a "whelming" B-plot, but she delighted in the "cute kittens and the welcome return of the easy breezy chemistry between Brandon Routh and Kimberly Sustad."

Further reading

References

External links
 
 The Nine Lives of Christmas at Hallmark

Films directed by Mark Jean